The Cinca Medio is a comarca in eastern Aragon, Spain. It is named after river Cinca. 

This comarca is bordered on the northwest by the Somontano de Barbastro comarca, to the east by La Litera and the south by the Bajo Cinca and Monegros. 

It is one of the regions with the greatest population density (40 inhabitants per km) in Aragon. The main sources of income are industry and agriculture.

Municipalities
Albalate de Cinca
Alcolea de Cinca
Alfántega
Almunia de San Juan
Binaced
Fonz
Monzón
Pueyo de Santa Cruz 
San Miguel del Cinca

See also
Bajo Cinca

References

External links

Geography of the Province of Huesca
Comarcas of Aragon